KWIM (104.9 FM) is a radio station broadcasting a Native American religious format. It is licensed to Window Rock, Arizona, United States. The station is currently owned by Across Nations.

References

External links
 

WIM